

This is a list of the National Register of Historic Places listings in Johnson County, Iowa.

This is intended to be a complete list of the properties and districts on the National Register of Historic Places in Johnson County, Iowa, United States. Latitude and longitude coordinates are provided for many National Register properties and districts; these locations may be seen together in a map.

There are 94 properties and districts listed on the National Register in the county, including 1 National Historic Landmark. Another 2 properties were formerly listed but have been removed.

Current listings

|}

Former listings 

|}

See also

 List of National Historic Landmarks in Iowa
 National Register of Historic Places listings in Iowa
 Listings in neighboring counties: Benton, Cedar, Iowa, Linn, Louisa, Muscatine, Washington

References

 
Johnson
Buildings and structures in Johnson County, Iowa